Tilly Münninghoff-Van Vliet (1879-1960) was a Dutch artist.

Biography 
Münninghoff-van Vliet née van Vliet was born on 27 November 1879 in Amsterdam. She attended the Koninklijke Academie van Beeldende Kunsten (Royal Academy of Art, The Hague). Her teachers included  and Jan Antonius van Schooten. In 1906 she married the artist  (1873-1944). The couple settled in Oosterbeek where Xeno was a teacher at the local drawing school. Xeno and Tilly often exhibited together. In 1944 their house was badly damaged during the World War II Battle of Arnhem, and much of their work was destroyed. Xeno died soon after.

Her work was included in the 1939 exhibition and sale Onze Kunst van Heden (Our Art of Today) at the Rijksmuseum in Amsterdam.

Münninghoff-van Vliet died on 29 December 1960 in Oosterbeek.

References

External links
images of Münninghoff-van Vliet's work on Xeno Münninghoff website

1879 births
1960 deaths
Artists from Amsterdam
20th-century Dutch women artists
20th-century Dutch women writers